Matthew Elias Corbally (April 1797 – 25 November 1870) was an Irish Liberal, Whig and Independent Irish Party politician.

Family
Corbally was the son of Elias Corbally and Mary née Keogh. He married Matilda Margaret Preston, daughter of Jenico Preston, 12th Viscount Gormanston (1775–1860) and Margaret Southwell, in 1842. They had one child, Mary Margaret Corbally (1845–1925), who married Alfred Stourton, Baron Mowbray, Segrave and Stourton and had ten children. They lived at Corbalton Hall in County Meath. Corbally and his wife are buried in a sealed vault at Saint Colmcille's Church, Skryne.

Education

He was educated by Rev. Richard Norris in  Drogheda, and then at Trinity College Dublin.

Political career
Corbally was first elected unopposed as a Whig-Radical MP for Meath at a by-election in 1840 but he did not stand for re-election at the next general election in 1841. When Daniel O'Connell was elected for both Meath and County Cork a by-election was called at which Corbally was again elected as a Whig unopposed. He then held the seat for the remainder of his life in 1870, joining the Independent Irish Party shortly after the general election in 1852 and joining the Liberal Party when it was formed in 1859. He was a supporter of the abolition of tithes, reform of corporations, and reform of the ballot, and was opposed to privileges being given to the Bank of Ireland.

Other activities
Corbally was also a Justice of the Peace and, in 1838, he was High Sheriff of Meath. He was also a captain in the Royal Meath Regiment.

References

External links
 

1797 births
1870 deaths
Irish Liberal Party MPs
UK MPs 1837–1841
UK MPs 1841–1847
UK MPs 1847–1852
UK MPs 1852–1857
UK MPs 1857–1859
UK MPs 1859–1865
UK MPs 1865–1868
UK MPs 1868–1874
High Sheriffs of Meath
Politicians from County Meath
Members of the Parliament of the United Kingdom for County Meath constituencies (1801–1922)

Alumni of Trinity College Dublin